Monte Fresco MBE (14 February 1936 – 5 December 2013) was an English photographer known for humorous photographs of sporting events. He covered seven World Cups, many European Championships and more than 40 FA Cup Finals, and Wimbledon Championships.

He said in an interview:
What makes a great football picture? Being in the right place with the right lens and... luck! After a working lifetime in sport for a national newspaper, with 80% of my time spent concentrating on football, I know that I have been very, very lucky. For me it was always about 'Incidents'. I was always looking for an incident that had gone unnoticed, something off the ball, something to make the reader stop and take a second look and think "I didn't see that!"

References

External links
 Canon Europe
 Sports Journalists
 UK Sport
 National Portrait Gallery

1936 births
2013 deaths
British photojournalists
Daily Mirror people
Members of the Order of the British Empire
Photographers from London